1-Ethyl-3-methylimidazolium chloride or [EMIM]Cl is an ionic liquid that can be used in cellulose processing.  The cation consists of a five-membered ring with two nitrogen and three carbon atoms, i.e. a derivative of imidazole, with ethyl and methyl groups substituted at the two nitrogen atoms.  Its melting point is 77–79 °C.

References

Ionic liquids
Imidazolium compounds
Chlorides